Faraday's law may refer to the following:
Faraday's laws of electrolysis in chemistry
Faraday's law of induction, also known as Faraday-Lenz Law, in electromagnetism physics
The Maxwell–Faraday equation